The European Young Masters is a European amateur mixed team golf championship for boys and girls under 16 organised by the European Golf Association. 

The inaugural event was held in 1995, and it has been played annually since, with the exception of 1996.

25 editions have been contested so far.

Format
The championship is contested by under-16 teams of two girls and two boys per EGA member federation, except in 1997 when an under-18 competition also took place. 

The championship was introduced in 1995, with a format consisting of three rounds of stroke play. Medals (gold, silver and bronze) are awarded to the three leading boys and girls, and a trophy is presented to each of the winners. 

In conjunction, a subsidiary Nation's Cup is contested in a similar format, where the three best of the two girl's and the two boy's scores will count each day. The total addition of the nine scores at the end of the competition will constitute the team’s score and the nation with the lowest score is proclaimed winner and presented a Nations' Cup trophy.

Results

Source:

Nation's Cup results

Source:

References

External links
European Golf Association: Full results

Amateur golf tournaments
Team golf tournaments
Golf tournaments in Europe
Recurring sporting events established in 1995